Marco Zambuto (born 10 April 1973 in Agrigento) is an Italian politician.

He ran for Mayor of Agrigento at the 2007 Italian local elections, supported by a coalition composed of Union of the Centre, Democrats of the Left and UDEUR. He was elected at the second round and took office on 29 May 2007.

Zambuto was re-elected for a second term on 23 May 2012. He resigned on 13 June 2014.

After a short period as member of The People of Freedom (2008-2010), he joined the Democratic Party in 2013.

See also
2012 Italian local elections
List of mayors of Agrigento

References

External links
 

1973 births
Living people
Mayors of Agrigento
Democratic Party (Italy) politicians
Union of the Centre (2002) politicians
The People of Freedom politicians
Christian Democracy (Italy) politicians